Boaz Kofman is a former Israeli footballer and football manager who played for Hapoel Petah Tikva, where he also served as manager, and for the Israel national football team.

Career

Playing career
Kofman joined Hapoel Petah Tikva at the age of 9 and graduated to the senior team in 1953, where he played until the end of the 1966–68 season, winning 6 league titles and one cup. During his Time with the club, Kofman scored 121 league goals and 29 cup goals, including scoring in three cup finals. After Kofman's departure from Hapoel Petah Tikva, he served as player-manager at Sektzia Ness Ziona for one season, before returning to Hapoel Petah Tikva at the beginning of the 1969–70 season. However, Kofman didn't play during the first half of the season, and in February 1970, Kofman was transferred to Beitar Tel Aviv Kofman retired from active play in 1971, after a season at Beitar Lod, where he served as player-manager.

In 1956, Kofman made his debut for Israel, in an Olympic qualifying match against USSR. Kofman played a total of 8 matches for the national team, scoring one goal, against Cyprus, in 1960.

Managing career
Kofman started his coaching career with stints as player-manager at Sektzia Ness Ziona and Beitar Lod, and, after retiring from active play, in 1971, Kofman served as manager for Hapoel Mahane Yehuda. In 1973, Kofman replaced Rehavia Rozenboim as head coach at Hapoel Petah Tikva, where he led the club to the 1974 cup final, in which the team lost to Hapoel Haifa. Kofman left Hapoel Petah Tikva at the end of the 1973–74 season, but returned to the club later in the next season, as a replacement manager, in an effort to save the club from relegation to Liga Artzit, which proved unsuccessful. Kofman guided the club during its first season in Liga Artzit, and left the coaching position at the end of the season, after failing to gain promotion back to Liga Leumit. Kofman returned for a third spell in Hapoel Peath Tikva as a replacement manager during the 1981–82 season, but didn't manage to save the club from relegating.

Honours
Israeli Premier League (6):
1954–55, 1958–59, 1959–60, 1960–61, 1961–62, 1962–63
Israel State Cup (1):
1957
'''Israel Super Cup (1)
1961–62 (shared)

External links
 Boaz Kofman Hapoel Petah Tikva Museum

References

1935 births
Living people
Israeli Jews
Israeli footballers
Israel international footballers
1956 AFC Asian Cup players
Footballers at the 1958 Asian Games
Hapoel Petah Tikva F.C. players
Sektzia Ness Ziona F.C. players
Beitar Tel Aviv F.C. players
Sektzia Ness Ziona F.C. managers
Hapoel Petah Tikva F.C. managers
Maccabi Sha'arayim F.C. managers
Liga Leumit players
Footballers from Petah Tikva
Association football forwards
Asian Games competitors for Israel
Israeli football managers